Ivan Kuchin (born 23 August 1988) is a Russian born, Kazakhstani professional ice hockey forward who is currently an unrestricted free agent. He most recently played under contract with Barys Astana of the Kontinental Hockey League (KHL).

References

External links

1988 births
Living people
Kazakhstani ice hockey players
Russian ice hockey forwards
Arlan Kokshetau players
Barys Nur-Sultan players
Beibarys Atyrau players
Dizel Penza players
Nomad Astana players
HC Rys players
HC Sibir Novosibirsk players
Stalnye Lisy players
People from Magnitogorsk
Sportspeople from Chelyabinsk Oblast